Epos or EPOS may refer to:

Science and technology
 Electronic point of sale, technology which enables an efficient recording of the sale of goods or services to the customer
 Embedded PowerPC Operating System, an IBM product
 OpenEPOS, in the comparison of real-time operating systems

Organisations
 Epos Ltd, a British loudspeaker manufacturer
 Epos (watch manufacturer)
 Emergency Physician Online Support, a group of physicians providing emergency medical services support
 EPOS Audio, based in Denmark, part of Demant

Arts and entertainment
 "Epos", a song by Zedd on Clarity
 Elaine Paige on Sunday, a show on BBC Radio 2
 Epic poem or epos

Other uses
 Mikoyan-Gurevich MiG-105, also known as EPOS, a proposed Russian spaceplane
 Epos (library ship), a floating library in Norway
 Evektor EPOS, an electric-powered airplane